is a railway station in the city of Matsumoto, Nagano, Japan, operated by the private railway operating company Alpico Kōtsū.

Lines
Shimojima Station is a station on the Kamikōchi Line and is 9.5 kilometers from the terminus of the line at Matsumoto Station.

Station layout
The station has one ground-level side platform serving a single bi-directional track. The station does not have a station building, but only a waiting room on the platform. The station is unattended.

Adjacent stations

History
The station opened on 10 May 1922.

Passenger statistics
In fiscal 2016, the station was used by an average of 211 passengers daily (boarding passengers only).

Surrounding area
Azusagawa High School

See also
 List of railway stations in Japan

References

External links

 

Railway stations in Japan opened in 1922
Railway stations in Matsumoto City
Kamikōchi Line